Denise Patricia McAdam  is a Scottish celebrity hairdresser based in London.

Denise cuts the hair of many members of the royal family. Since the mid-1970s she has worked for other public figures, including Bo Derek, Britt Ekland, Ronan Keating, Grace Kelly, Sade, Frank Sinatra, JLS and The Saturdays.

In June 2010 as part of the Queen's Birthday Honours McAdam received the Royal Victorian Medal, "for hairdressing services to the Royal Family". In 2014 she began appearing as one of the main judges on the BBC TV series Hair.

References

Living people
Place of birth missing (living people)
Year of birth missing (living people)
Recipients of the Royal Victorian Medal
Scottish hairdressers
Scottish businesspeople